Karimnagar Silver Filigree is a silver filigree made in Karimnagar, India. It is an ancient art of Karimnagar.

History 
The art form was patronised during the rule of the Nizams of Hyderabad, and noblemen commissioned elaborate pieces. These are displayed in the Salar Jung Museum.

Karimnagar Silver Filigree received  Intellectual property rights protection or Geographical Indication (GI) status in 2007.

See also 
 Bidriware
 List of Geographical Indications in India
 Tarakasi

References 

Karimnagar district
Culture of Telangana
Jewellery making
Silversmithing
Indian metalwork
Geographical indications in Telangana
Jewellery of India